Mel "Angie Stardust" Michaels (1939 – 21 October 2007) was a singer, actress, and drag artist of the 1950s and 1960s and the first black star of New York's Club 82. She was also the manager of Hamburg, Germany's first all-male strip club, Crazy Boys, and was the founder and proprietor of Angie's Nightclub in Schmidts Tivoli Theatre.

Early life
Stardust was born in Norfolk, Virginia and raised in Harlem, New York. She began performing at age 14
and was a transgender woman.

Career
Stardust performed at the Jewel Box Revue and Club 82, both in New York City. She was one of the first drag stars to take female hormones, an act she was scorned for at the time, and either quit over or was fired for.

In 1974, Stardust moved to Europe, settling in Hamburg, Germany. There, she became manager of the city's first all-male strip club, Crazy Boys.

In 1983, Stardust performed in the Rosa von Praunheim's City of Lost Souls, a film that helped influence Hedwig and the Angry Itch, in which she played the proprietor of a restaurant called the Hamburger Queen and a boarding house called Pension Stardust. Two of her co-stars were Jayne County and Tara O'Hara. The film was first screened as part of a punk rock roadshow. Shortly after the film was finished, Stardust completed her gender affirmation with surgery to complement the hormones she had been taking for years.

Stardust founded her own club, Angie's Nightclub, in Schmidts Tivoli Theatre in Hamburg, Germany in 1990. By 1994, the venue was regarded as "one of the best places to hear free-form jazz." Stardust performed nightly until 1999 and came to be known as the Big Mama of Soul, as she was known for singing soul, jazz, pop, and musical theater standards. Annually since 2008, Angie's Nightclub has been one of the participating venues for Hamburg's Reeperbahn Festival. Acts have included Skinny Lister, Mo Kenney, Ezra Furman, Kristoffer Ragnstam, Andreas Moe, Leyya, Louis Berry, George Cosby, Vita Bergen, Joel Culpepper, Conner Youngblood, Inna Modja, Bess Atwell, and others.

In 2017, Angie's Nightclub was still "one of the most popular clubs of Sankt Pauli’s night scene," according to the travel blog At 30,000 Feet. As of 2020, Stardust's club is still extant and operates under the same name.

Discography

Filmography

References

LGBT people from Virginia
American drag queens
African-American drag queens
African-American musicians
American LGBT singers
LGBT African Americans
Transgender women
Transgender drag performers